Molenhoek is a hamlet in the Dutch province of Gelderland. It is a part of the municipality of Druten, and lies about 11 km northwest of Wijchen.

It was first mentioned in 1899 as Molenhoek, and means "wind mill corner" after a wind mill which was demolished in 1922. The postal authorities have placed Molenboek under Horssen

References

Populated places in Gelderland
Druten